The monk parakeet (Myiopsitta monachus), also known as the Quaker parrot, is a species of true parrot in the family Psittacidae. It is a small, bright-green parrot with a greyish breast and greenish-yellow abdomen. Its average lifespan is 20–30 years. It originates from the temperate to subtropical areas of Argentina and the surrounding countries in South America. Self-sustaining feral populations occur in many places, mainly in North America and Europe.

Taxonomy
The monk parakeet was described by French polymath Georges-Louis Leclerc, Comte de Buffon, in 1780 in his Histoire Naturelle des Oiseaux. The bird was also illustrated in a hand-coloured plate engraved by François-Nicolas Martinet in the Planches Enluminées D'Histoire Naturelle, which was produced under the supervision of Edme-Louis Daubenton to accompany Buffon's text. Neither the plate caption nor Buffon's description included a scientific name, but in 1783, Dutch naturalist Pieter Boddaert coined the binomial name Psittacus monachus in his catalogue of the Planches Enluminées. As Buffon did not specify the origin of his specimen, in 1937 the American ornithologist James Peters assigned the type location as Montevideo, Uruguay. The monk parakeet is now placed in the genus Myiopsitta that was introduced by French naturalist Charles Lucien Bonaparte in 1854. The genus name combines the Ancient Greek mus, muos meaning "mouse" and the New Latin psitta meaning "parrot", alluding to the mouse-grey face and underparts. The specific epithet monachus is Late Latin for a "monk".

The monk parakeet is one of two species in the genus Myiopsitta, the other being the cliff parakeet (Myiopsitta luchsi). The two parakeets were previously considered to be a single species. Due to morphological and behavioral differences, and geographical dissimilarities, the cliff parakeet has been elevated to species status. The cliff parakeet's altitudinal range apparently does not overlap, so is thus entirely, but just barely, allopatric. The American Ornithological Society has deferred recognizing the cliff parakeet as distinct "because of insufficient published data".

Three subspecies are recognized:

 M. m. monachus (Boddaert, 1783) is found in Argentina from southeastern Santiago del Estero Province throughout the Río Salado and lower Paraná basins to Buenos Aires Province and Uruguay; it is the largest subspecies.
 M. m. calita (Boddaert, 1783) is found in the Andean foothills up to 1,000 m above mean sea level, from southeastern Bolivia (Santa Cruz and Tarija departments) to Paraguay and northwestern Argentina, then west of the range of monachus, extending into the lowlands again in Río Negro and possibly Chubut provinces.
Smaller than monachus, wings more prominently blue, gray of head darker.
 M. m. cotorra (Finsch, 1868) is found in southwestern Brazil (Mato Grosso, Mato Grosso do Sul, possibly Rio Grande do Sul) throughout the Río Paraguay and middle Paraná basins, as well as the Gran Chaco. It is essentially identical to M. m. calita, but reported as less yellow below and brighter overall.

The subspecies' ranges meet in the general area of Paraguay, and there they are insufficiently delimited. The distinctness and delimitation of M. m. calita and M. m. cotorra especially require further study.

Like the other neotropical parrots, the monk parakeet is usually placed in the tribe Arini, which might warrant elevation to subfamily rank as the Arinae. M. monachus belongs to the long-tailed clade of these – macaws and conures, essentially, which would retain the name Arini/Arinae if this polyphyletic group were split.

Description

Females tend to be 10–20% smaller, but can only be reliably sexed by DNA or feather testing. It has bright-green upperparts. The forehead and breast are pale gray with darker scalloping and the rest of the underparts are very light-green to yellow. The remiges are dark blue, and the tail is long and tapering. The bill is orange. The call is a loud and throaty chape(-yee) or quak quaki quak-wi quarr, and screeches skveet.

Domestic breeds in colors other than the natural plumage have been produced. These include birds with white, blue, and yellow in place of green. As such coloration provides less camouflage, feral birds are usually of wild-type coloration.

Behaviour and ecology

The monk parakeet is the only parrot that builds a stick nest, in a tree or on a man-made structure, rather than using a hole in a tree. This gregarious species often breeds colonially, building a single large nest with separate entrances for each pair. In the wild, the colonies can become quite large, with pairs occupying separate "apartments" in composite nests that can reach the size of a small automobile. These nests can attract many other tenants, including birds of prey such as the spot-winged falconet (Spiziapteryx circumcincta), ducks such as the yellow-billed teal (Anas flavirostris), and even mammals. Their five to 12 white eggs hatch in about 24 days.

Unusually for a parrot, monk parakeet pairs occasionally have helper individuals, often grown offspring, which assist with feeding the young (see kin selection).

The lifespans of monk parakeets have been given as 20-30 years; the former might refer to typical lifespans in captivity and/or in the wild, while the latter is in the range of maximum lifespans recorded for parakeets.

Native distribution 
The monk parakeet is globally very common. In Argentina, Brazil, and Uruguay, monk parakeets are regarded as major agricultural pests (as noted by Charles Darwin, among others). Their population explosion in South American rural areas seems to be associated with the expansion of eucalyptus forestry for paper pulp production, which offers the bird the opportunity to build protected nests in artificial forests where ecological competition from other species is limited.

Invasive species

 

Self-sustaining feral populations have been recorded in several U.S. states and various regions of Europe (namely Spain, Portugal, Azores, Madeira, Balearic Islands, Gibraltar, France, Corsica, Malta, Cyprus, Sardinia, Italy, Greece, Channel Islands, Great Britain, Ireland, Germany and Belgium), as well as in British Columbia, Canada, Brazil, Mexico, Chile, Israel, Bermuda, Bahamas, the United States, Cayman Islands, Puerto Rico, Easter Island, South Korea, Singapore, and Japan. As it is an open-woodlands species, it adapts readily to urban areas.

In areas where they have been introduced, some fear they will harm crops and native species, while others dispute evidence of harm caused by feral colonies, and oppose exterminating these birds, but local bans and eradication programs exist in some areas of the U.S. Outside the U.S., introduced populations do not appear to raise similar controversy, presumably because of smaller numbers of birds, or because their settlement in urban areas does not pose a threat to agricultural production. The U.K. appears to have changed its view on its feral populations and the Department for the Environment, Food and Rural Affairs is planning to remove monk parakeets from the wild, as it believes that they threaten local wildlife and crops.

Feral populations are often descended from very small founder populations. Being as social and intelligent as they are, monk parakeets develop some cultural traditions, namely vocal dialects that differ between groups. In populations descended from a large number of birds, a range of "dialects" exists. If the founder population is small, however, a process similar to genetic drift may occur if prominent founders vocalize in an unusual "dialect", with this particular way of vocalizing becoming established in the resulting feral colony. For example, no fewer than three different "dialects" occur among the feral monk parrots of the Milford, Connecticut, metropolitan area.

Brazil
The species has in recent years expanded its range in Brazil, where a self-sustaining population occurs in the downtown area of Rio de Janeiro. Since this population occurs far from the bird's original range in Brazil – it was only found in the far south and southwest – it is most probably a consequence of escapees from the pet trade. In Rio de Janeiro, the bird can be easily seen at the Aterro do Flamengo gardens – where it nests on palm trees and feeds on their fruit; the Rio birds seem to favor nesting amid the leaves of coconut palm trees, and in the vicinity of the neighboring domestic flight terminal, the Santos Dumont Airport and in the gardens of Quinta da Boa Vista, where communal nests roughly 1 m in diameter have been seen. In Santa Catarina State, probable escapees have been reported on occasion for quite some time, and a feral population seems to have established itself in Florianópolis early in the first decade of the 21st century when birds were observed feeding right next to the highway in the Rio Vermelho-Vargem Grande area.

Mexico

The monk parakeet was first recorded in Mexico City in 1999. Records exist from seven other locations, including the cities of Puebla, Morelia, Celaya, Oaxaca, Tuxtla Gutiérrez, Hermosillo, and Mexicali, and the mouth of the Loreto River in Baja California Sur.

Nesting populations are known in Mexico City and Oaxaca. A small but growing population has also been established in the southern part of the city of Puebla, Puebla, in the surroundings of the city's aviary, which they are known to visit frequently, and where they can often be seen clinging to the outer side of its mesh walls. No studies have been made to assess the impact they might have on the relict populations of green parakeets that live in the same area and other well-wooded zones of the city.

Following the ban on the trade of native parrot species, local traditional bird sellers have now switched to the monk parakeet as their staple parrot, and that might have increased the number of escapees. Sometimes, the head and breast feathers of monk parakeets are dyed yellow to deceive uninformed buyers, mimicking the endangered yellow-headed amazon. The presence of this species in seven geographically distant and independent locations in Mexico indicates that the source of these individuals is most likely the pet trade.

United States
Thousands of monk parakeets were imported to the United States between the 1960s and the 1980s as pets. Many escaped or were intentionally released, and populations were allowed to proliferate. By the early 1970s, M. monachus was established in seven states, and by 1995, it had spread to eight more. In Florida alone, estimates range from 150,000 to 500,000. Austin and Houston, Texas, also have thriving monk parakeet populations.

As one of the few temperate-zone parrots, the monk parakeet is more able than most to survive cold climates (partly because they build communal nests about heat-producing electrical equipment atop utility poles), and colonies exist as far north as New York City, Chicago, Wisconsin, Cincinnati, Louisville, coastal Rhode Island, Massachusetts, Connecticut, and southwestern Washington. Edgewater, New Jersey has had a colony since 1980. This hardiness makes this species second only to the rose-ringed parakeet among parrots as a successful introduced species.

New York State
Prior to egg-laying, one bird was captured and the nest eventually was removed due to concerns that the nest built adjacent to an electrical transformer created a fire hazard.

They have also found a home in Brooklyn, New York, after an accidental release decades ago of what appear to have been black-market birds within Green-Wood Cemetery. The grounds crew initially tried to destroy the unsightly nests at the entrance gate, but no longer do so because the presence of the parrots has reduced the number of pigeons nesting within it. The management's decision was based on a comparative chemical analysis of pigeon feces (which destroy brownstone structures) and monk parakeet feces (which have no ill effect). The monk parakeets are in effect preserving this historic structure.

Brooklyn College has a monk parakeet as an "unofficial" mascot in reference to the colony of the species that lives in its campus grounds. It is featured on the masthead of the student magazine. They have also made their homes in the lamp posts in Pelham Bay Park in the Bronx. Most of these monk parakeet populations have been traced to shipments of captured birds from Argentina.

Chicago
The population in Chicago is estimated to be at 1,000 birds, with healthy colonies located in several of the city's parks. Parrot origin theories include a University of Chicago experiment gone awry, an overturned truck on its way to a pet store, escaped birds from a holding pen at O'Hare Airport or released / escaped pets. According to University of Chicago ornithologist Dr. Stephen Pruett-Jones, "They got here through the pet trade and the pet trade really peaked in the mid- to late 1960s."

The first documented parrot nest in Chicago dates to 1973. The species continues to thrive despite several unusually harsh winters that occurred during the 1980s and in 2014. Various attempts to remove them were made over the years, most of which were resisted by a group of Hyde Park residents, including Mayor Harold Washington. The birds are generally welcomed in the city, especially by bird watchers, and were the subject of a 2012 ornithological study.

Europe

Monk parakeets can be seen in Madrid, Barcelona, Cadiz, Athens, Seville, Torremolinos, Málaga, Nerja, Valencia, Tarragona, Roquetas de Mar (Andalusia), Zaragoza, the Canary Islands, and Majorca in the Balearic Islands. They were first seen around 1975. In Madrid, they especially frequent the Ciudad Universitaria (Complutense University campus) and Casa de Campo park. They are a common sight in Barcelona parks, often as numerous as pigeons. They form substantial colonies in Parc de la Ciutadella, Parc de la Barceloneta, and in smaller city parks such as Jardins Josep Trueta in Poble Nou, with a colony as far north as Empuriabrava. They are more frequent in watered urban parks with grass areas and palm trees, near to a river or the sea. The monk parakeet, as an invasive species, has become a problem to local fauna such as pigeons and sparrows, but not yet so harmful to magpies. Parakeets have also caused trouble to agriculture near the cities.

Spain has outlawed the possession, selling, breeding, and trafficking of monk parakeets since 2013.

Madrid has the greatest population of monk parakeets in Europe, with 10,800 parakeets as of June 2015. As of 2015, the estimated population of monk parakeets in Barcelona was 6,248.

In Greece, they have established breeding colonies in the National Garden, Athens.

The United Kingdom population in 2011 is believed to be around 150, in the Home Counties region. The Department for the Environment, Food and Rural Affairs announced plans in 2011 to control them, countering the threat to infrastructure, crops, and native British wildlife by trapping and rehoming, removing nests, and shooting when necessary.

Groups of monk parakeets can be found in the Belgian capital city Brussels and its surrounding areas. They have been living in the wild at least since the 1970s.

As pets 
Monk parakeets are highly intelligent, social birds. Those kept as pets routinely develop vocabularies of scores of words and phrases. Due to this early speaking ability, it is overtaking the cockatiel as the favorite bird to teach to talk. Another contributing factor to growing popularity is that this bird has a shorter lifespan and lower price than African grey parrots.

Because of monk parakeets' listing as an agricultural pest, the U.S. states of California, Georgia, Kansas, Kentucky, Hawaii, Maine, New Jersey, Pennsylvania, Tennessee, and Wyoming, as well as Western Australia outlaw sale and ownership. In Connecticut, one can own monk parakeets, but cannot sell or breed them. In New York and Virginia, one can own monk parakeets with banding and registration. In Ohio, owning one is legal if the bird's flight feathers are clipped or it is incapable of free flight.

References

Further reading

External links 

 Monk parakeet entry in the World Parrot Trust's Parrot Encyclopedia
 Guide to ageing and sexing (PDF) by Javier Blasco-Zumeta and Gerd-Michael Heinze
 

 Information on monk parakeets as introduced species
 Monk parakeet news from around the world
 Naturalized Parrots in the U.S.
 Monk parakeet factsheet from the University of Florida/IFAS
 BrooklynParrots.com, a website about monk parakeets in Brooklyn
 The Parakeet of City Streets, an article on introduced monk parakeets on 10000birds.com

 Information on monk parakeets as pets
 Quaker Parakeet Society website
 The Quaker Parakeet Handbook, a guide to keeping monk parakeets as pets
 QuakerVille, a forum for monk parakeet owners

monk parakeet
Feral parrots
monk parakeet
Birds of Argentina
Birds of the Pantanal
Birds of Paraguay
Birds of Uruguay
monk parakeet
monk parakeet
Talking birds